The athletics events at the 2010 South American Games were held from March 20–23 at the Alfonso Galvis Duque Stadium in Medellín, Colombia. The competition also acted at the 4th South American Under-23 Championships. A total of 42 events were contested, 21 by male athletes and 21 by female athletes. The stadium was 1541 metres above sea level, thus some athletes' performances benefited from altitude assistance.

Brazil topped the medal table with 13 golds and 41 medals overall. Hosts Colombia were the next most successful (11 golds and 35 total) while Venezuela and Peru took third and fourth place respectively. Ana Cláudia Lemos Silva provided one of the highlights of the competition, equalling the South American record in the women's 100 metres with a run of 11.17 seconds. Jorge McFarlane of Peru took victory in both the 110 metres hurdles and the long jump, setting championships and Games records in both events, as well as breaking the Peruvian record in the hurdles.

Two Colombian athletes also set new championships and Games records in their events: María Lucelly Murillo set new best marks of 56.08 m in the women's discus throw and Rafith Rodríguez won in Colombian record time  in the 800 metres (1:47.20). Other record breaking performances of note included Ana Camila Pirelli's Paraguayan record in heptathlon, although this was only enough for the bronze in the competition.

The 10,000 m gold medallist and 5000 m runner-up Karina Alvarez of Peru was stripped of her medals after failing a drugs test for cocaine. Bolivian 400 m runner Alison Mariana Delfin – who helped win a relay bronze medal – was also later disqualified and banned for two years due to a doping offence.

Medal summary

Men

Women

Medal table

References

External links
Athletics at the official 2010 Games website

 
Athletics
South American Games
2010
International athletics competitions hosted by Peru